Gérard Bonnevie (born 20 February 1952 in Val-d'Isère) is a retired French alpine skier who competed in the men's slalom at the 1976 Winter Olympics.

External links
 sports-reference.com
 

1952 births
Living people
French male alpine skiers
Olympic alpine skiers of France
Alpine skiers at the 1976 Winter Olympics
Sportspeople from Savoie
20th-century French people